Asprocottus is a genus of ray-finned fish belonging to the family Cottidae, the typical sculpins. These fishes are endemic to endemic to Lake Baikal in Russia.

Species
There are currently eight recognised species in this genus:
 Asprocottus abyssalis Taliev, 1955
 Asprocottus herzensteini L. S. Berg, 1906 (Herzenstein's rough sculpin)
 Asprocottus intermedius Taliev, 1955
 Asprocottus korjakovi Sideleva, 2001
 Asprocottus minor Sideleva, 2001
 Asprocottus parmiferus Taliev, 1955
 Asprocottus platycephalus Taliev, 1955
 Asprocottus pulcher Taliev, 1955

References

Abyssocottinae
 
Taxa named by Lev Berg
Fish of Lake Baikal